Kirby Lake Airport  is a registered aerodrome located adjacent to Kirby Lake, Alberta, Canada.

References

Registered aerodromes in Alberta
Transport in the Regional Municipality of Wood Buffalo